Bernhard Kießig (born 1966) is a German pianist, especially jazz pianist, composer and lecturer. He composed part of the oratorio Eins for Ökumenischer Kirchentag 2021.

Career 
Kießig studied Protestant church music and jazz piano at the Hochschule für Musik und Darstellende Kunst Frankfurt am Main, on a scholarship of the Hanns-Seidel-Stiftung. He was a recipient of prizes of both Jugend musiziert and Jugend jazzt, and played in the Landesjugendjazzorchester Hesse. He founded a jazz quartet, The Academic Project, supported by the "Live Music Now" foundation, and recognised in the Frankfurt jazz scene. He worked at the Staatstheater Darmstadt as pianist and repetiteur for opera and ballet. In 2013, Kießig became referent for pop music at the Evangelische Landeskirche in Hessen und Nassau. Beginning in 2018, he has also worked as pianist for the dance faculty at the Hochschule für Musik und Darstellende Kunst Frankfurt.

He was commissioned to compose parts of the oratorio Eins for Ökumenischer Kirchentag 2021 in Frankfurt. It was published by the Dehm-Verlag  and first performed in a livestream concert on 4 May 2021, with Kießig as the pianist.

Works 
 Eins, oratorio, a 2021 collaboration for the Ökumenischer Kirchentag 2021 in Frankfurt

References

External links 
 
 1000 and 1 Years archiv.luminale.de 18 March 2018
 Bernhard Kießig: Einschätzung zum Monatslied-Projektder Nordkirchebezogen auf dessenWirkanalyse (in German) popularmusik-nordkirche.de April 2021
 Trumpet meets Organ (in German) trumpetmeetsorgan.de

German classical composers
German male conductors (music)
Composers of Christian music
Frankfurt University of Music and Performing Arts alumni
Academic staff of the Frankfurt University of Music and Performing Arts
Living people
Musicians from Frankfurt
German jazz pianists
21st-century classical composers
21st-century German conductors (music)
21st-century German composers
German male classical composers
20th-century German male musicians
21st-century German male musicians
1966 births